Stenaelurillus nigricaudus is a species of jumping spider that is the type species of the genus Stenaelurillus. The species has been identified in Algeria, Burkina Faso, Gambia, Mali, Niger and Senegal.

The spider is typical of the genus. The male was first described by Eugène Simon in 1886. The female was first identified in 1936 by Ludovico di Caporiacco but was not formally described until 2005 by Nikolaj Scharff and Tamás Szűts. The male is distinguished by its palpal bulb and the female by its flanges at the copulatory openings.

References

Fauna of Algeria
Fauna of Burkina Faso
Fauna of Mali
Fauna of Niger
Fauna of Senegal
Fauna of the Gambia
Salticidae
Spiders described in 1886
Spiders of Africa